Snødomen ("The Snow Dome") is a mountain in Haakon VII Land at Spitsbergen, Svalbard. The mountain has a height of 1,215 m.a.s.l. and is located east of the bay of Möllerfjorden, between the glaciers of Mayerbreen and Tinayrebreen.

References

Mountains of Spitsbergen